Sclerophrys gracilipes is a species of toad in the family Bufonidae. It is found in southeastern Nigeria and east- and southward to southern Cameroon, Equatorial Guinea (including the island of Bioko), Gabon, northern Republic of the Congo, and northern and northeastern Democratic Republic of the Congo. It is also likely to occur in southwestern Central African Republic and in the Cabinda Enclave of Angola. The holotype was collected from the Benito River in what was then French Congo. Common name French Congo toad has been coined for it.

Sclerophrys gracilipes is a very common species that is found in lowland forest at elevations below . It can also survive in degraded secondary habitats. Breeding takes place in flowing water, such as creeks in marshes and slow-flowing streams. It can be affected by habitat loss. It occurs in the Monte Alén National Park in Equatorial Guinea and in the Garamba National Park in the Democratic Republic of the Congo, and presumably in other protected areas too.

References 

gracilipes
Frogs of Africa
Amphibians of West Africa
Amphibians of Cameroon
Amphibians of the Democratic Republic of the Congo
Amphibians of Equatorial Guinea
Amphibians of Gabon
Fauna of Nigeria
Amphibians of the Republic of the Congo
Taxa named by George Albert Boulenger
Amphibians described in 1899
Taxonomy articles created by Polbot